Gundna is a village in Doda district of the Indian union territory of Jammu and Kashmir. The village is located just 40 kilometres from the district headquarters Doda.

Demographics
According to the 2011 census of India, Gundna has 366 households. The literacy rate of Gundna village was 53.18% compared to 67.16% of Jammu and Kashmir. In Gundna, Male literacy stands at 70.42% while the female literacy rate was 35.99%.

Transport

Road
Gundna is directly connected by road. In order to travel from Doda to Gundna, one has to travel by the Road via Ghat Bhabore Dhara road.

Rail
The nearest major railway station to Gundna is Udhampur Railway Station located at a distance of 131 kilometres respectively.

Air
The nearest airport to Gundna is Jammu Airport located at a distance of 190 kilometres and is a 5.5-hour drive.

References

Villages in Doda district

Chenab Valley